This is a list of cemeteries in Australia.

Australian Capital Territory
 Gungahlin Cemetery, Mitchell, ACT
 Hall Cemetery
 St John the Baptist Church, Reid
 Woden Cemetery

Australian island territories

Cocos (Keeling) Islands
 Early Settlers' Graves, Home Island
 Home Island Cemetery

Christmas Island
 Christmas Island Cemetery

Heard Island
 historic sealers cemetery

Lord Howe Island
 Main cemetery
 Pinetrees cemetery
 Thompson Family Cemetery

Macquarie Island
 Isolated burials

Norfolk Island
 Norfolk Island Cemetery, Kingston

New South Wales

Blue Mountains
 Blackheath
 Faulconbridge
 Katoomba
 Kurrajong 
 Lawson
 Megalong Valley
 Mount Irvine
 Mount Victoria
 Mount Wilson
 Wentworth Falls

Central Coast
 Bradys Gully
 Catherine Hill Bay
 Cooranbong
 Frosts Rest
 Helys Grave
 Jilliby
 Kincumber South
 Kincumber – St Pauls
 Lisarow
 Martinsville
 Morisset
 Point Clare
 Point Frederick
 Ronkana
 Veteran Hall
 Wamberal
 Woongarrah
 Wyee
 Wyee Bethshan

Greater West
 Bowenfels
 South Bowenfels
 Moyne Farm, Lithgow

Hunter Region
 Maitland Jewish Cemetery
 Sandgate Cemetery

Macarthur Region
 Camden
 Greendale Anglican
 Greendale Catholic
 Mulgoa
 Picton

Sydney
 Badgerys Creek – 2 cleared
 Balmain Cemetery
 Balmain Catholic Cemetery
 Botany, Pioneer Memorial Park
 Brooklyn Cemetery
 Camperdown Cemetery
 Castlebrook Memorial Park, Rouse Hill
 Crows Nest, St Thomas Rest Park
 Devonshire Street Cemetery
 Eastern Suburbs Memorial Park, (Sydney) – Incorporates Botany Cemetery, Eastern Suburbs Crematorium and Pioneer Park (where headstones from early Sydney burial grounds have been relocated).
 Field of Mars Cemetery, (Sydney) – Ryde, it was proclaimed on 3 December 1887 and opened for burials in 1890. Famous interments include: H. H. Calvert (artist) and Rita Hunter (opera singer).
 Gordon – St Johns Anglican Church and Cemetery
 Gore Hill cemetery, (Sydney) – Operated from 1864 to 1974.
 Little Bay, Coast Hospital Cemetery
 Liverpool 
 Macquarie Park Cemetery and Crematorium – North Ryde, New South Wales
 Matraville, Eastern Suburbs Memorial Park
 North Parramatta, St Patrick's Cemetery, North Parramatta – Oldest Catholic cemetery in Australia (1824)
 Northern Suburbs Memorial Gardens – North Ryde, New South Wales
 Old Sydney Burial Ground
 Parramatta, St John's Cemetery, Parramatta – Australia's oldest surviving European cemetery (1790)
 Petersham Cemetery 
 Pine Grove Memorial Park, Western Sydney
 Randwick, St Jude's Anglican Cemetery
 Richmond 
 Rookwood Cemetery, (Sydney) – Proper name 'The Necropolis, Rookwood" at over 2.8 km2, reputedly the largest necropolis in the Southern Hemisphere if not the world, first used in 1867. More than 1,000,000 interments.
 Ryde – St Annes
 South Coogee, Randwick General Cemetery
 St Peters, St Peters Church, St Peters and cemetery
 Vaucluse, South Head General Cemetery
 Waverley Cemetery, (Sydney) – Opened in 1877. Dramatic location on picturesque coastal site, many local historical figures such as writer Henry Lawson. 50,000 allotments.
 Windsor

Southern Highlands (New South Wales)
 Goulburn
 Old Goulburn
 Jewish
 Gundaroo Catholic Pioneer Cemetery
 Marulan Anglican
 Marulan Catholic
 Michelago Cemetery
 Penrose
 Queanbeyan Lawn Cemetery
 Riverside Cemetery, Queanbeyan
 Taralga
 Welby
 Wagga Wagga War Cemetery

Northern Territory
 Adelaide River War Cemetery

Alice Springs
 Alice Springs Cemetery
 Alice Springs Pioneer Cemetery or Stuart Town Cemetery

Darwin
 Darwin Chinese Memorial Cemetery
 Darwin General Cemetery
 Darwin Pioneer Cemetery (1865–1919)
 Gardens Cemetery
 Thorak Regional Cemetery

Queensland

Brisbane City
 Balmoral Cemetery, Brisbane—also known as Bulimba Cemetery and (historically) Kangaroo Point Cemetery
 First Brisbane Burial Ground, also known as the Skew Street Cemetery
 Francis Lookout, a private cemetery at Corinda
 God's Acre Cemetery, Archerfield
 Lutwyche Cemetery
 Mount Thompson Crematorium, Queensland's first crematorium
 North Brisbane Burial Ground, also known as Paddington Cemetery, Milton Cemetery, now redeveloped as Lang Park
 Nudgee Cemetery & Crematorium
 Nundah Cemetery – Formerly known as German Station Cemetery
 Pinnaroo Cemetery and Crematorium, Brisbane
 South Brisbane Cemetery – also known as Dutton Park Cemetery
 St Matthews Anglican Church, Grovely
 The Gap Uniting (formerly Methodist) Church Cemetery & Columbarium Wall, The Gap
 Toowong Cemetery, Brisbane – Proper name "The Brisbane General Cemetery" the oldest existing and largest Brisbane cemetery. Opened in 1875. Resting place of author Steele Rudd.

Croydon Shire
 Croydon Cemetery
 Old Croydon Cemetery
 Station Creek Cemetery
 Tabletop Cemetery

Logan City
 Bethania Lutheran Church
 Carbrook Lutheran Cemetery
 Kingston Pioneer Cemetery
 Old St Mark's Anglican Church, Daisy Hill (formerly Slacks Creek)

Redland City
 Cleveland Pioneer Cemetery
 Dunwich Cemetery
 Toowoomba Region
 Allora Cemetery
 Drayton and Toowoomba Cemetery

Whitsunday Region
 Flemington Road Cemetery, Bowen
 Collinsville Cemetery
 Proserpine Cemetery

Others
 Cooktown Cemetery, Shire of Cook
 Cressbrook Cemetery, Evelyn, Tablelands Region
 Garners Beach Burial Ground, Cassowary Coast Region
 Gympie Cemetery, Gympie Region
 Ipswich General Cemetery, City of Ipswich
 Joskeleigh Cemetery, Joskeleigh, Shire of Livingstone
 Mackay General Cemetery, Mackay Region
 Maryborough Cemetery, Fraser Coast Region
 McLeod Street Pioneer Cemetery, Cairns, Cairns Region
 Mill Point Cemetery, Shire of Noosa
 St Patrick's Church, Rosevale, Scenic Rim Region
 South Rockhampton Cemetery, Rockhampton Region
 Thursday Island Cemetery, Shire of Torres
 Warwick General Cemetery, Southern Downs Region
 West End Cemetery, Townsville, City of Townsville

South Australia
 Alberton Cemetery, Alberton (Closed)
 Centennial Park Cemetery, Pasadena — Opened in 1936 during South Australia's centenary year.
 Cheltenham Cemetery, Cheltenham
 Dudley Park Cemetery, Dudley Park
 Enfield Memorial Park, Clearview
 North Brighton Cemetery, Somerton Park
 North Road Cemetery, Nailsworth
 Payneham Cemetery, Payneham South
 Smithfield Memorial Park, Evanston South
 West Terrace Cemetery, Adelaide — South Australia's oldest public cemetery.
 Willaston General Cemetery

Tasmania
 Cambridge Cemetery
 Cornelian Bay Cemetery
 East Risdon Cemetery
 Isle of the Dead – Port Arthur, early convict graves, part of the old gaol and convict reform settlement.
 Kingston Cemetery
 Mornington Memorial Gardens
 Penguin General Cemetery
 Pontville Cemetery
 Queenborough Cemetery – headstones relocated to Queenborough Memorial Garden and Cornelian Bay Cemetery

Victoria

Metropolitan Melbourne cemeteries
 Altona Memorial Park
 Andersons Creek Cemetery
 Boroondara General Cemetery
 Box Hill Cemetery
 Brighton Cemetery
 Bunurong Memorial Park
 Burwood Cemetery
 Cheltenham Memorial Park
 Cheltenham Pioneer Cemetery
 Coburg Cemetery
 Dandenong Community Cemetery
 Eltham Cemetery
 Emerald Cemetery
 Fawkner Crematorium and Memorial Park
 Footscray General Cemetery
 Frankston Memorial Park
 Greensborough Cemetery
 Hawdon Street Cemetery
 Healesville Cemetery
 Keilor Cemetery
 Lilydale Lawn Cemetery
 Lilydale Memorial Park
 Melbourne General Cemetery
 Mornington Cemetery
 Northcote Cemetery
 Northern Memorial Park
 Oakleigh Pioneer Memorial Park
 Old Melbourne Cemetery
 Preston Cemetery
 Rye Cemetery and Memorial Gardens
 Scots Uniting Church Graveyard, Campbellfield
 Sorrento Cemetery
 Springvale Botanical Cemetery
 St Andrew's Graveyard, Brighton
 St Kilda Cemetery
 St Katherines Anglican Church Graveyard, St Helena
 Templestowe Cemetery
 Truganina Cemetery
 Warringal Cemetery
 Werribee Cemetery
 Will Will Rook Cemetery
 Williamstown Cemetery
 Yarra Glen Cemetery

Country Victorian cemeteries
 Aberfeldy Cemetery
 Ararat General Cemetery
 Bacchus Marsh – Maddingley General Cemetery
 Bairnsdale Cemetery
 Ballaarat New Cemetery
 Ballaarat Old Cemetery
 Bendigo
 Bendigo Cemetery
 Eaglehawk Cemetery
 Kangaroo Flat Remembrance Park
 White Hills Cemetery
 Castlemaine Cemetery
 Geelong Eastern Cemetery
 Geelong Western Cemetery
 Kyneton Cemetery
 Warracknabeal Cemetery
 Wooling Hill Memorial Estate

Western Australia
 East Perth Cemeteries
 Fremantle Cemetery, (Perth) – Opened 1898 south of the Swan River and city of Perth
 Guildford Cemetery, Western Australia
 Karrakatta Cemetery, (Perth) – Opened in 1899 north of the Swan River and closest to the Perth city centre.
 Kenwick Pioneer Cemetery, in the City of Gosnells
 Lakes Lawn Cemetery, Parklands, Mandurah
 Mandurah Cemetery, Mandurah – Closed Dec 1985
 Memorial Park Cemetery (Albany, Western Australia)
 Mundaring Cemetery, in the Shire of Mundaring
 Midland Cemetery
 Parkerville Children's Home bush cemetery, in the Shire of Mundaring
 Pinnaroo Valley Memorial Park, in the Perth suburb of Padbury
 Wooroloo Sanatorium and cemetery, in the Shire of Mundaring

References

External links

The following links provide basic information on thousands of Australian cemeteries:
 Australian Cemeteries
 Australian Cemetery Geolocations
 Australian Cemeteries Index
 St. John's Cemetery, Parramatta

Australia
 
Cemeteries
Cemeteries